The château de Craon, also known as the château d'Haroué or palais d'Haroué is a French château located in a small valley in the centre of the village of Haroué, in the Saintois, in the département of Meurthe-et-Moselle and the région of Lorraine. It was built between 1720 and 1732 by Germain Boffrand during the period when Lorraine was independent of France, for Marc de Beauvau, prince de Craon, viceroy of Tuscany and constable of Lorraine.

Surprisingly, the architect had to integrate into his plans the four towers and moat of an older medieval château, a consideration for medieval buildings which was unusual for the classicist period. Le château's design also symbolises a year :
 365 windows,
 52 fireplaces,
 12 towers (several included in the buildings),
 4 bridges crossing the moat.

The decoration was largely entrusted to artists from Lorraine : Jean Lamour (1698–1771) for the gates, balconies and staircases, Pillement (1698–1771) for the painted decoration of one of the towers, Barthélemy Guibal (1699–1757), sculptor of the fountains of place Stanislas at Nancy, for the statuary. The park "à la française" was designed by Emilio Terry.

It has since been lived in by the descendants of Marc de Beauvau.

The château was classified as a monument historique in 1983.

Notes

External links
 Official site

Châteaux in Meurthe-et-Moselle
Monuments historiques of Grand Est
Gardens in Meurthe-et-Moselle
Historic house museums in Grand Est
Museums in Meurthe-et-Moselle